Harnett may refer to:


People

Given name
 Harnett Kane (1910–1984), American author

Surname
 Cornelius Harnett (1723–1781), American statesman
 Curt Harnett (born 1965), Canadian racing cyclist
 Cynthia Harnett (1893–1981), English writer of children's historical fiction.
 Greg Harnett (born 1990), Canadian lacrosse player
 Ian Harnett (1926–2001), Scottish footballer
 Joan Harnett (born 1943), New Zealand netball player and real estate agent
 Jon Harnett (born 1988), Canadian lacrosse player
 Ricci Harnett (born 1975), British actor
 William Harnett (1848–1892), Irish-American painter

Other uses
 Harnett County, North Carolina
 Harnett, Harnett County, North Carolina
 Harnett County Airport
 USS Harnett County (LST-821)

See also
 Garnett (disambiguation)